Couches is a commune in the Saône-et-Loire department in the region of Bourgogne-Franche-Comté in eastern France.

Sights

Chateau
The chateau complex includes a number of structures from different periods.

The chateau is often called the chateau of Margaret of Burgundy, Queen of France, wife of Louis X of France, who was confined to the Chateau Gaillard after allegedly committing adultery. She died there after apparent ill treatment in 1315. One version of the story is that she did not die in the Chateau Gaillard, but escaped and was taken in by her cousin, Marie of Couches, and housed in the chateau and died there in 1333.

See also
Communes of the Saône-et-Loire department

References

Communes of Saône-et-Loire
Châteaux in Saône-et-Loire